General Sir Richard John Meade  (25 September 1821 – 20 March 1894) was a British Indian Army officer who served as the Chief Commissioner of Mysore from 1870 to 1881.

Military career
Meade was born at Innishannon County Cork to Captain John Meade of the Royal Navy and Elizabeth Quin. He studied at the Royal Naval School at New Cross in London, after which he received his commission as ensign and was posted to the 65th Regiment of the Bengal Native Infantry. He was part of the Central India Field Force during the troubles of 1857-59 and led the column which captured Tantya Tope and hanged him.

He was the British resident in the state of Hyderabad in 1875–81. He tutored and protected Maḥbūb ʻAlī Khān, the underage nizam (ruler). Thomas Henry Thornton, Meade's biographer and author of General Sir Richard Meade and the Feudatory States of Central and Southern India (1898), regarded this position as one of the most politically challenging in India. Meade's successes included "rebuffing" efforts by prime minister Mir Turab Ali Khan, known as Sir Sālār Jang (war leader) to reestablish Hyderabad's authority over the neighbouring province of Berar.

He also served in political employment at Gwalior, Indore, Mysore, Baroda and Hyderabad. After retirement, he functioned as Chairman of the Hyderabad State Railway Company. He died at Hyères in France, aged 73 where he was buried. His grave bears the inscription: "Born on 25th September 1821 he entered in eternal life on 20th March 1894 at Hyères in the South of France where his mortal remains have been laid".

References

Sources

1821 births
1894 deaths
British Indian Army generals
British military personnel of the Indian Rebellion of 1857
British East India Company Army officers
Knights Grand Commander of the Order of the Star of India
Companions of the Order of the Indian Empire
People educated at the Royal Naval School
People from County Cork